William Adger Moffett (October 31, 1869 – April 4, 1933) was an American admiral and Medal of Honor recipient known as the architect of naval aviation in the United States Navy.

Biography

Born October 31, 1869 in Charleston, South Carolina, he graduated from the United States Naval Academy in 1890. He was the son of George Hall Moffett (1829–1875), who enlisted in the Confederate States army as a private, and was promoted for bravery on the field of battle, eventually attaining the rank of Captain and adjutant-general, Hagood's Brigade, Twenty-fifth South Carolina Volunteers.

Moffett was on  when she sailed across the Pacific and captured Guam. Ultimately ending up in the Philippines, a month after the US victory at Manila Bay, the Charleston then shelled enemy positions in support of American and Filipino troops at the Battle of Manila (1898).

Commander Moffett was the captain of the Chester during the Tampico Affair. (See also United States occupation of Veracruz, 1914). (See text of the Citation set forth below.)

In World War I, he was commander of the Great Lakes Naval Training Center near Chicago, where he established an aviator training program. While commanding the battleship  (1918–1921) he supported the creation of a scout plane unit on the ship.

Although not himself a flyer, Moffett became known as the "Air Admiral" for his leadership of the Navy's Bureau of Aeronautics from its creation in 1921 with Captain Henry C. Mustin as its first Assistant Chief. In this role, he oversaw the development of tactics for naval aircraft, the introduction of the aircraft carrier, and relations with the civilian aircraft industry. A master politician, he maintained official support for naval aviation against Billy Mitchell, who favored putting all military aircraft into a separate air force. In that regard, Moffett benefited from his longstanding friendship with Franklin D. Roosevelt, who had been appointed Assistant Secretary of the Navy by Woodrow Wilson in 1913.

He is buried in Arlington National Cemetery, alongside his wife Jeanette Whitton Moffett (1885–1958), and one of their three sons, William Adger Moffett, Jr. (1910–2001), who was also a Navy admiral.

In 2008, Moffett was inducted into the National Aviation Hall of Fame in Dayton, Ohio.

Decorations

 Top – Naval Aviation Observer wings.
 1st row – Medal of Honor
 2nd row – Navy Distinguished Service Medal, Silver Lifesaving Medal, Navy Spanish Campaign Medal
 3rd row – Philippine Campaign Medal, Mexican Service Medal, World War I Victory Medal

Medal of Honor citation
Rank and organization: Commander, U.S. Navy. Entered service at: Charleston, South Carolina Born: 31 October 1869, Charleston, South Carolina G.O. No.: 177, 4 December 1915. Other Navy award: Distinguished Service Medal.

Citation:

For distinguished conduct in battle, engagements of Vera Cruz, 21 and 22 April 1914. Comdr. Moffett brought his ship into the inner harbor during the nights of the 21st and 22d  without the assistance of a pilot or navigational lights, and was in a position on the morning of the 22d to use his guns at a critical time with telling effect. His skill in mooring his ship at night was especially noticeable. He placed her nearest to the enemy and did most of the firing and received most of the hits.

Namesake
 The  was named for him.
 The naval air station that he helped establish in Sunnyvale, California was renamed Moffett Field in his memory soon after his death.
 Mount Moffett, a mountain in Alaska.
 John Philip Sousa's march, "The Aviators" is dedicated to William A. Moffett, the man responsible for Sousa's enlistment and commission in the American Navy during World War I.
 In May 1999, NAVAIR dedicated its headquarters building to William A. Moffett.

See also

 List of Medal of Honor recipients (Veracruz)
 Bureau of Aeronautics
 Naval aviation
 U.S. Occupation of Veracruz, Mexico, 1914

References

Further reading
 Edward Arpee, From Frigates to Flat-tops: The story of the life and achievements of Rear Admiral William Adger Moffett, U.S.N. "The Father of Naval Aviation" October 31, 1869 – April 4, 1933. (Published and distributed by the author, 1953).
 William F. Trimble, Admiral William A. Moffett: Architect of Naval Aviation (Washington, D.C.: Smithsonian Institution Press, 1994)

External links
 
 William Adger Moffett Papers, 1920–1948 MS 198 and William Adger Moffett Collection, 1887–1976 MS 234 held by Special Collections & Archives, Nimitz Library at the United States Naval Academy

1869 births
1933 deaths
United States naval aviation
United States Navy Medal of Honor recipients
United States Navy personnel of the Spanish–American War
United States Navy personnel of World War I
United States Naval Academy alumni
United States Navy rear admirals (upper half)
Burials at Arlington National Cemetery
Accidental deaths in New Jersey
Military personnel from Charleston, South Carolina
Battle of Veracruz (1914) recipients of the Medal of Honor
Victims of aviation accidents or incidents in 1933
Victims of aviation accidents or incidents in the United States
Recipients of the Navy Distinguished Service Medal